The 2001 Nepal census was conducted by the Nepal Central Bureau of Statistics.
According to the census, the population of Nepal in 2001 was 23,151,423.
Working with Nepal's Village Development Committees at a district level, they recorded data from all the main towns and villages of each district of Nepal. The data included statistics on population size, households, sex and age distribution, place of birth, residence characteristics, literacy, marital status, religion, language spoken, caste/ethnic group, economically active population, education, number of children, employment status, and occupation.

See also

 List of village development committees of Nepal
 1991 Nepal census
 2011 Nepal census

References 

Censuses in Nepal
Census
Nepal